Olivia Elizabeth N. Federici (née Allison; born 13 February 1990) is a British synchronized swimmer. She was born in Plymouth.

Career
Her most notable achievements to date are winning four consecutive gold medals at the British Synchronized Swimming Championships from 2004 to 2007. Olivia has competed at numerous European and World Championships, and finished in 14th position in the women's duet at the 2008 Beijing Olympics. She represented Team GB again at the 2012 Olympic Games in the duet and team competitions with an improvement of ninth place in the former event.

Following a competent performance in the duet competition at the 2010 Commonwealth Games, she was rewarded with a silver medal; this continued with an overall eighth place in the women's duet at the 2011 World Championships with her partner Jenna Randall, who she has worked since the 2006 Commonwealth Games.  She also competed in the women's duet at the 2016 Olympics, this time with Katie Clark.

References 

1990 births
Living people
British synchronised swimmers
Synchronized swimmers at the 2008 Summer Olympics
Synchronized swimmers at the 2012 Summer Olympics
Synchronized swimmers at the 2016 Summer Olympics
Olympic synchronised swimmers of Great Britain
Sportspeople from Plymouth, Devon
Commonwealth Games silver medallists for England
Synchronised swimmers at the 2010 Commonwealth Games
Commonwealth Games medallists in synchronised swimming
Medallists at the 2010 Commonwealth Games